Malcolm Bates may refer to:

 Malcolm Bates, a character in the soap opera Emmerdale played by Tom Adams 
 Malcolm Bates (transport administrator), chairman of London Regional Transport from 1999 to 2003